Vidisha Assembly constituency Vidhan Sabha seat is one of the 230 Vidhan Sabha (Legislative Assembly) constituencies of Madhya Pradesh state in central India. This constituency came into existence in 1957, as one of the Vidhan Sabha constituencies of Madhya Pradesh state. Presently INC's Shashank Bhargava is the MLA from this constituency. He was preceded by Kalyan Singh Thakur in 2014 when the by-election for this seat was held in 2014 after CM of Madhya Pradesh Shivraj Singh Chouhan resigned from this constituency post registering victory at two seats Budhni and Vidisha Assembly constituency.

Overview

Vidisha (constituency number 144) is one of the 5 Vidhan Sabha constituencies located in Vidisha district. This constituency presently covers the entire Vidisha tehsil of the district with 141, and entire Gulabganj tehsil's 75 villages.

It is a segment of Vidisha (Lok Sabha constituency) along with seven other Vidhan Sabha segments namely Basoda in Vidisha district; Bhojpur, Sanchi and Silwani in Raisen district; Budhni, Ichhawar in Sehore District; Khategaon in Dewas district.

Members of Legislative Assembly

References

Vidisha
Assembly constituencies of Madhya Pradesh